Richard Williams Bell (January 6, 1811 — October 24, 1857) was the son of farmer John Bell (he was allegedly killed by a spirit) and the author of Our Family Trouble.

Early life 
Richard was born on January 6, 1811. His father, John Bell, was the only person in history whose death was attributed to the doings of a Spirit (Bell Witch). In 1817, his family came under attack by a witch, who was believed to be a lady called Kate Batts. Various accounts written afterward, tell stories similar to other poltergeist legends. It began with noises in the walls and grew to include unusual sounds; people being slapped and pinched, objects being thrown, and animals being spooked without visible cause. Richard wrote of the events in his diary. Martin Van Buren Ingram, in 1894, wrote the book An Authenticated History of the Bell Witch which was created on the basis of Richard's diary.

Authenticated History of the Bell Witch 
In 1846, Bell journalized the disturbances in a comprehensive manuscript that he later passed to his son, State Rep. Allen Bell, who later shared it with his closest family members. In the late nineteenth century, Martin Ingram incorporated Richard Williams Bell's manuscript into his book, Authenticated History of the Bell Witch, in the form of a single chapter entitled, "Our Family Trouble."

Death 
Richard Williams Bell died on October 24, 1857. He was buried with his parents and several siblings in the Old Bell Cemetery, aka John Bell Cemetery near Adams, Tennessee.

References

External links
 The Bell Witch of Tennessee - website which includes the full text of An Authenticated History of the Famous Bell Witch - the book upon which the legend is largely based.

1811 births
1857 deaths
People from Robertson County, Tennessee
American male writers
Writers from Tennessee